Middle European League for the season 2013-14 was the second and last season of the Middle European League.

Team information

Regular season

Final four

Awards
Finals MVP: Jia Perkins (173-G-82) of Good Angels
Player of the Year: Miljana Bojović (181-G-87) of Good Angels
Guard of the Year: Miljana Bojović (181-G-87) of Good Angels
Forward of the Year: Tianna Hawkins (191-F-91) of UNIQA Eurol.
Center of the Year: Luca Ivanković (198-C-87) of Novi Zagreb
Import Player of the Year: Tianna Hawkins (191-F-91) of UNIQA Eurol.
Defensive Player of the Year: Maurita Reid (172-PG-85) of PEAC-Pecs
Coach of the Year: Maroš Kováčik of Good Angels

1st Team
G: Miljana Bojović (181-G-87) of Good Angels
PG: Milica Dabović (173-PG-82) of Lyon
F: Tianna Hawkins (191-F-91) of UNIQA Eurol.
F: Louella Tomlinson (193-F-88) of PINKK-Pecsi
C: Luca Ivanković (198-C-87) of Novi Zagreb

2nd Team
SG: Samantha Whitcomb (180-SG-88) of Rockingham
G: Zsófia Fegyverneky (178-G-84) of UNIQA Eurol.
F: Rebecca Tobin (195-F-88) of WF DVTK
F/C: Stefanie Murphy (192-F/C-89) of MBK Ruzomb.
C: Latoya Williams (192-C-87) of PEAC-Pecs

Honorable Mention
Maurita Reid (172-PG-85) of PEAC-Pecs
Tijana Ajduković (196-C-91) of Spartak V MR
Brittainey Raven (183-G-88) of WF DVTK
Helena Sverrisdottir (185-F/G-88) of WF DVTK
Lucia Krč-Turbová (186-F-89) of Piestanske C.
Amy Jaeschke (196-C-89) of Samorin
Romana Vyňuchalová (192-C/F-86) of Samorin
Agnieszka Skobel (180-SG-89) of Wisla Krakow

All-Imports Team
SG: Samantha Whitcomb (180-SG-88) of Rockingham
PG: Maurita Reid (172-PG-85) of PEAC-Pecs
F: Tianna Hawkins (191-F-91) of UNIQA Eurol.
F/C: Stefanie Murphy (192-F/C-89) of MBK Ruzomb.
C: Latoya Williams (192-C-87) of PEAC-Pecs

External links
 Profile at eurobasket.com

2013-14
2013–14 in European women's basketball leagues
2013–14 in Slovak basketball
2013–14 in Hungarian basketball
2013–14 in Croatian basketball
basketball
basketball